Sam Dugdale (born 30 September 2000) is an English rugby union player who plays for Sale Sharks in the Premiership Rugby.  His father Ian was also a noteworthy sportsman and still holds the long jump record at Garstang Community Academy in Lancashire, a record he's held since 1982.

References

External links

ESPN Profile
Ultimate Rugby Profile

1999 births
Living people
English rugby union players
Rugby union players from Lancaster
Sale Sharks players
Rugby union flankers